The 1960 NBA draft was the 14th annual draft of the National Basketball Association (NBA). The draft was held on April 11, 1960, before the 1960–61 season. In this draft, eight NBA teams took turns selecting amateur U.S. college basketball players. A player who had finished his four-year college eligibility was eligible for selection. If a player left college early, he would not be eligible for selection until his college class graduated. In each round, the teams select in reverse order of their win–loss record in the previous season. Before the draft, a team could forfeit its first-round draft pick and then select any player from within a 50-mile radius of its home arena as their territorial pick. The Minneapolis Lakers participated in the draft, but relocated to Los Angeles and became the Los Angeles Lakers prior to the start of the season. The draft consisted of 21 rounds comprising 100 players selected.

Draft selections and draftee career notes
Oscar Robertson from the University of Cincinnati was selected before the draft as Cincinnati Royals' territorial pick.  He went on to win the Rookie of the Year Award in his first season. Jerry West from West Virginia University was selected second by the Minneapolis Lakers. Three players from this draft, Robertson, West and 6th pick Lenny Wilkens, have been inducted to the Basketball Hall of Fame. They were also named in the 50 Greatest Players in NBA History list announced at the league's 50th anniversary in 1996.

Robertson's achievements include an NBA championship with the Milwaukee Bucks in 1971, Most Valuable Player Award in 1964, 11 All-NBA Team selections and 12 All-Star Game selections. West played 14 seasons with the Lakers, winning the NBA championship in 1972. He was also selected to 12 consecutive All-NBA Teams and 14 consecutive All-Star Games. He later coached the Lakers for three seasons. Wilkens' achievements include 9 All-Star Game selections. After his playing career, he became a successful head coach. He won the NBA championship in 1979 with the Seattle SuperSonics and the Coach of the Year Award in 1994. He held the record for most games as a head coach in the NBA, with 2,487 games coached. He was inducted to the Basketball Hall of Fame as a coach in 1998. He became the third man to be inducted as a player and as a coach, after John Wooden and Bill Sharman. Two players from this draft, 3rd pick Darrall Imhoff and 5th pick Lee Shaffer, have also been selected to an All-Star Game. Tom Sanders, the 8th pick, won 8 NBA championships with the Boston Celtics in the 1960s. He later briefly coached the Celtics in 1978. Al Attles, the 39th pick, also had a coaching career. He coached the San Francisco/Golden State Warriors for 14 seasons, winning the NBA championship in 1975.

Key

Draft

Other picks
The following list includes other draft picks who have appeared in at least one NBA game.

Trades
 On January 24, 1960, the New York Knicks acquired Dick Garmaker and a second-round pick from the Los Angeles Lakers in exchange for Ray Felix and a fourth-round pick. The Knicks used the pick to draft Dave Budd. The Lakers used the pick to draft Ben Warley.

See also
 List of first overall NBA draft picks

References
General

Specific

External links
NBA.com
NBA.com: NBA Draft History

Draft
National Basketball Association draft
NBA draft
NBA draft
Basketball in New York City
Sporting events in New York City